St-Armand, St. Armand, Saint Armand, or variation, may refer to:

People
 Saint Herman (disambiguation), aka Saint Armand

Places
Saint-Armand, Quebec, Canada
St. Armand, New York, USA
St. Armand's Key in Florida, USA

See also
 Armand (name)
 Armand (disambiguation)